is a Japanese footballer who plays for Nagano Parceiro.

Club statistics
Updated to 23 February 2018.

References

External links
Profile at Nagano Parceiro 
Profile at Kyoto Sanga FC 

1993 births
Living people
Association football people from Shiga Prefecture
Japanese footballers
J2 League players
J3 League players
Japan Football League players
Kyoto Sanga FC players
SP Kyoto FC players
MIO Biwako Shiga players
AC Nagano Parceiro players
Association football midfielders